The 2018 COSAFA Under-17 Championship is the 7th edition of the COSAFA U-17 Championship, an association football tournament organised by the Council of Southern Africa Football Associations (COSAFA) involving teams from Southern Africa for players aged 17 and below.

COSAFA announced that the COSAFA U-17 Championship hosted by Mauritius between 19–29 July 2018 would be the region's qualifying tournament for the 2019 Africa U-17 Cup of Nations  in Tanzania.

Participating teams

Officials

Referees 
 Ibrahim Amisy Tsimanohitsy (Madagascar)
 Tshepo Mokani Gobagoba (Botswana)
 António Dungula (Angola)
 Ishmael Chizinga (Malawi)
 Derrick Kafuli (Zambia)
 Retselisitsoe David Molise (Lesotho)
 Ganesh Chutooree (Mauritius)

Assistant Referees

 Ravoharizo Randrianarivelo (Madagascar)
 Zacarias H. Baloi (Mozambique)
 Mapoho Mapoho (Lesotho)
 Sem Moses Singeve (Namibia)
 Said Omar Chebli (Comoros)
 Shailesh Gobin (Mauritius)
 Ram Babajee (Mauritius)
 Tafadzwa Nkala (Zimbabwe)
 Gcina Sam Mamba (Swaziland)

Draw

The draw for the group stage was held on 31 May 2018.

Venues
The tournament will be played at Port Louis (St. François Xavier Stadium) and Belle Vue Maurel (Anjalay Stadium).

Group stage
All times are local, MUT (UTC+4).

Group A

Group B

Group C

Ranking of second-placed teams

Knockout stage

Semi-finals

Third place match

Final
Winner qualifies for 2019 Africa U-17 Cup of Nations.

References 

COSAFA Under-17 Championship
2018 in African football
Cos
International association football competitions hosted by Mauritius